John Bentley (March 23, 1822March 5, 1894) was a Welsh American immigrant, building contractor, Democratic politician, and Wisconsin pioneer.  He was a member of the Wisconsin State Assembly, representing Milwaukee County in the 1863, 1878, 1879, and 1880 sessions.  He also served as sheriff of Milwaukee County during the 1880s, and constructed many notable buildings of early Wisconsin.  In historical documents, his last name was sometimes spelled Bently.

Biography
Bentley was born on March 23, 1822, in Newtown, Wales.  When he was young, his father emigrated to the United States, leaving him in the care of his mother.  He had little formal education and was employed as a child to work as a clerk in a seed store.  Through his teenage years, he sought to educate himself by studying in the evenings, and brought himself up to general knowledge.

At age 17, he emigrated to the United States, joining his father in New York City.  He worked a number of jobs over the next few years.  He was an apprentice plumber and brassfitter in Brooklyn for a year and a half, then moved to in Saratoga County, New York, where he worked for a farmer, who also operated a lumber business on his land.  Finally, he moved to Orange County, New York, where he found his trade as an apprentice builder and mason.  He worked as a journeyman in Haverstraw, New York, then began to take on his own contracts.

In 1848, he moved to Milwaukee, Wisconsin, and became a prominent building contractor in the new city.  His first major contract was for the building of the Milwaukee Female Seminary, followed quickly by contracts for the North Presbyterian Church, and Saint John's Evangelical Lutheran Church.  He also went on to construct the State Reform School in Waukesha.  He also did mason work on the Newhall House, which famously burned in 1883, and the original Nunnemacher Grand Opera House, which burned in 1895.

Later in his career, he partnered with his son, Thomas R. Bentley, and worked on a number of significant projects around the state and region, including some of the state office buildings in Madison, the north wing of the Northern Insane Asylum in Oshkosh, the Wisconsin School for the Deaf in Delavan, and the Traverse City State Hospital in Traverse City, Michigan.  After his retirement, his son carried on the business and went on to other significant works.

Political career
Bentley cast his first vote for James K. Polk in the 1844 United States presidential election, and always afterward identified with the Democratic Party.  He was elected chairman of the town of Lake, Milwaukee County, Wisconsin, in 1862, and later that year he won his first term in the Wisconsin State Assembly. In the 1863 session, he represented Milwaukee County's 9th Assembly district, then-comprising roughly the southern quarter of the county.  Serving in the Assembly during the American Civil War, Bentley was identified as a War Democrat, and strongly supported the Union cause and raising Union Army volunteers.

He was not a candidate for re-election in 1863, but he was later elected to four consecutive terms, serving in the 1878, 1879, and 1880 sessions, representing Milwaukee County's 5th Assembly district, which in those years comprised the southeast quadrant of the city of Milwaukee.  His chief accomplishment in the Assembly was bringing Milwaukee the state normal school—the predecessor to the University of Wisconsin–Milwaukee.

In 1880, he was the Democratic nominee for sheriff of Milwaukee County, but suffered his only electoral defeat in the November general election, losing to German American Republican John Rugee.  He ran again in 1882, however, and this time won the office.

His last public office was park commissioner of the city of Milwaukee, having been appointed by Mayor Thomas H. Brown in 1889.  He held that office until his death.

Bentley died at his home in Milwaukee on March 5, 1894, after suffering from pneumonia.

Personal life and family
John Bentley was a son of Thomas Bentley and his wife Jane ( Jones).  After emigrating to the United States, Thomas Bentley worked in manufacturing woolen goods in New Jersey until coming to live with his son in Milwaukee in the 1860s.

John Bentley married Sarah Ann Roberts, whose parents were English emigrants, on May 17, 1845.  They had eight children together, though only four of his children survived him.

Electoral history

Wisconsin Assembly (1877, 1878, 1879)

| colspan="6" style="text-align:center;background-color: #e9e9e9;"| General Election, November 6, 1877

| colspan="6" style="text-align:center;background-color: #e9e9e9;"| General Election, November 5, 1878

| colspan="6" style="text-align:center;background-color: #e9e9e9;"| General Election, November 4, 1879

References

1822 births
1894 deaths
People from Newtown, Powys
Welsh emigrants to the United States
Politicians from Milwaukee
Democratic Party members of the Wisconsin State Assembly
Wisconsin city council members
County supervisors in Wisconsin
Wisconsin sheriffs
19th-century American politicians